Walter Frank Woodul (September 25, 1892 – October 1, 1984) was a Texas politician who was an early proponent of a state highway system. He served as the 30th Lieutenant Governor of Texas from 1935 to 1939, under Governor James V. Allred.

External links
 Biography from the Texas State Cemetery website.

1892 births
1984 deaths
Lieutenant Governors of Texas
Democratic Party Texas state senators
Democratic Party members of the Texas House of Representatives
People from Laredo, Texas
20th-century American politicians